{{DISPLAYTITLE:D1-like receptor}}
The D1-like receptors are a subfamily of dopamine receptors that bind the endogenous neurotransmitter dopamine. The D1-like subfamily consists of two G protein–coupled receptors that are coupled to Gs and mediate excitatory neurotransmission, of which include D1 and D5. For more information, please see the respective main articles of the individual subtypes:

See also 
 D2-like receptor

References 

Dopamine receptors